Ptolus is a campaign setting for the Dungeons & Dragons role-playing game written by Monte Cook. It was published by Malhavoc Press on August 10, 2006. Ptolus is also the name of the city featured in the campaign.

Setting
Ptolus is based upon the setting for Cook's home game, which served as the initial campaign for the 3rd edition of Dungeons and Dragons. The campaign centers around the city of the same name, which lies on the Whitewind Sea at the edges of the crumbling empire of Tarsis. The city lies in the shadow of an impossibly tall and narrow spire. Below the city are many dungeons, including the city's sewers and a forgotten dwarven city named Dwarvenhearth.

The book's author claims it is the "most deluxe roleplaying product ever published," weighing in at 672 pages with multiple special features, including a CD-ROM that includes a new adventure, The Night of Dissolution, and two previous Malhavoc products with Ptolus connections: The Banewarrens and Chaositech. The book was produced in hardback on full color glossy paper. The first 1,000 pre-ordered copies of the Ptolus book had their copy signed and numbered by Monte Cook and also received a printed copy of The Night of Dissolution, which was not otherwise available at the time, and five copies of A Player's Guide to Ptolus.

A Player's Guide to Ptolus consists of the material of Chapter 1 of Ptolus. It was available for separate sale from several months before Ptolus either individually or in packs of five. As well as five copies coming free with pre-orders of Ptolus, it is also available in PDF format on CD that comes with all printed copies of the Ptolus book and available for free download. The  contents of this book is designed to represent the common knowledge available to city residents or visitors to Ptolus. It is intended that each player in a Ptolus campaign should have access to a copy of this book.

World
The world of Ptolus is called Praemal. 80% of its surface is covered with water, and it is currently in an ice age. The planet has two visible moons, and allegedly a third that disappeared eons ago.

Chaositech
The technology of Ptolus is slightly more advanced than usually found in other fantasy settings. Gunpowder and clockworks are quite mundane. In addition to "normal" technology, there is also chaositech, which is a mixture of fantasy settings' magic items and cyberpunks' cyberwares. It is considered an abomination in the world, although there are a few who consider it to hold great potential and would sell their own soul for a piece of it - as they usually do. As can be discerned from the name, this technology originates from chaos. Some of the greatest experts in chaositech are the drow.

New races
Although Praemal is populated by the standard D&D races, there are few new races as well, and some twist in the original races, too. Races that are considered savage in other settings are civilized people in Ptolus, like the minotaurs.

Shoal elves
Seafaring elves; in the world of Ptolus, elves must sleep, and therefore they don't have the immunity of sleep spells and effects.

Harrow elves
Despite the fact that dark elves exist in the world of Praemal (and, as usual, are greatly feared and despised), there is another twisted kind of elves. The harrow elves, which were created by Ghul, are terribly deformed and considered second-class citizens by most of Ptolus. They are very much like the orc race from Tolkien's mythos, elves that have been perverted by a powerful overlord. They are considered more apt to be tempted by evil and most often do not have good family lives. (Since every child produced by a harrow elf will be a harrow elf, there is a common conception that the race has a tendency towards rape.)  Harrow elves have considerable magic abilities, and their favorite class is monk.

Cherubim elves
Winged elves, who are more fragile, but very swift, too. They usually live in the mountains, and do not interfere with the life of other mortals. They have thin bones and pale skin.

Litorians
Humanoid lions, who have a very strong sense of honour. They have extraordinary physical abilities and senses.  This race also appears in The Diamond Throne, the setting introduced in Monte Cook's Arcana Unearthed.

Reception
It has received good reviews, and won the 2007 ENnie award for Product of the Year.

References

Sources

D20 System
Dungeons & Dragons campaign settings
ENnies winners
Fictional city-states